Canada competed at the 1924 Winter Olympics in Chamonix, France. They won one gold medal, in ice hockey.

Medalists

Figure skating

Men

Women

Pairs

Ice hockey

The Canadian Amateur Hockey Association (CAHA) chose the Toronto Granites as the 1923 Allan Cup champions to represent Canada in ice hockey at the 1924 Winter Olympics, and W. A. Hewitt was chosen oversee the national team's finances at the Olympics. Hewitt was empowered by the CAHA to name replacement players as needed, and recruited Harold McMunn and Cyril Slater as replacements when four players from the Granites were unable to travel to the Olympics. In his weekly report to the Toronto Daily Star, Hewitt wrote that the Granites would face multiple changes in conditions compared to hockey games in Canada. He did not feel the team would be affected by playing outdoors on natural ice in the morning or afternoon, despite that the team was accustomed to playing indoors with electric lighting on artificial ice. He also felt that the larger ice surface and lack of boards around the sides of the rink would mean more stick handling and less physical play.

During the Olympics, Hewitt attended the annual meeting and elections for the Ligue Internationale de Hockey sur Glace (LIHG). Since its rules stated that one of the vice-presidents must be from North America, Hewitt and United States Amateur Hockey Association president William S. Haddock opted for a coin toss, which decided that Haddock was elected to the position. When the Olympics organizers wanted to select hockey referees by drawing names out of a hat, Hewitt and Haddock agreed to another coin toss to decide on the referee for the game between Canada and the United States men's national team. Hewitt feared having an inexperienced referee for the game, and his suggested to have LIHG president Paul Loicq officiate the game was confirmed by the coin toss. The Granites defeated the United States team by a 6–1 score, and won all six games played to be the Olympic gold medallists.

Group A
The top two teams (highlighted) advanced to the medal round.

Medal round
Results from the group round (Canada-Sweden and United States-Great Britain) carried forward to the medal round.

Top scorer

Speed skating

Men

All-round 
Distances: 500m; 5000m; 1500m & 10,000m.

References

Sources

 
 
 
 Olympic Winter Games 1924, full results by sports-reference.com

Nations at the 1924 Winter Olympics
1924
Olympics, Winter